Kristina Jørgensen (born 18 January 1998) is a Danish handball player for Metz Handball and the Danish national team.

She represented Denmark at the 2017 World Women's Handball Championship in Germany.

She also represented Denmark in the 2015 European Women's U-17 Handball Championship in Macedonia, leading to the trophy.

Achievements 
Youth World Championship:
Silver Medalist: 2016
European Youth Championship:
Winner: 2015
Junior European Championship:
Silver Medalist: 2017

Individual awards 
 MVP of the EHF European Under-19 Championship: 2017
 Best Defender of the EHF U-17 European Championship: 2015
 All-Star Left back of Damehåndboldligaen: 2019/2020, 2020/2021
 Youth player of the Year in Damehåndboldligaen: 2017/18
 Top Scorer of the EHF European League with 72 goals: 2022

Family 

She has two older sisters: Line and Stine who also play handball. Line has returned from habdball, Stine plays handball at København Håndbold.

References

External links

1998 births
Living people
Danish female handball players
People from Horsens
Viborg HK players
Sportspeople from the Central Denmark Region